Eupithecia mendosaria is a moth in the family Geometridae first described by Charles Swinhoe in 1904. It is found in Ethiopia, Kenya and South Africa.

References

Moths described in 1904
mendosaria
Moths of Africa